Stand Atlantic are an Australian pop punk band from Sydney, formed in 2012. The band consists of vocalist/guitarist Bonnie Fraser, guitarist David Potter, bassist Miki Rich, and drummer Jonno Panichi.

Stand Atlantic gained prominence in the Australian music scene with the release of their demo EPs, Catalyst (2013) and A Place Apart (2015). The band signed with Rude Records in 2017 and released the single "Coffee at Midnight", which landed them positive reviews. They released an EP, Sidewinder, in September 2017. Their debut album, Skinny Dipping, was released in October 2018. Their second album, Pink Elephant, was released on 7 August 2020. Their third album, F.E.A.R., was released on 6 May 2022.

History

Formation and early EPs (2012–2017)
In 2012, friends Bonnie Fraser (lead vocals/rhythm guitar) and Arthur Ng (lead guitar), joined by David Potter (bass) and Jordan Jansons (drums) formed a band under the name What It's Worth. The four-piece pop punk band began recording material, and released their debut single, "Bulletproof Vest" in December 2012. In May 2013, they released their debut demo EP, Catalyst via physical and online platforms, followed by the release of their next single, "Romeo". It was accompanied by two national tours of Australia in support of their debut EP.

In early 2014, the group changed their name from What It's Worth to Stand Atlantic. The band released their first single under the new name, "Breakaway", featuring the band's new sound, in March 2014. It was accompanied by a fan-made lyric video.

Stand Atlantic returned to the studio during November 2014, working on their next demo EP, A Place Apart. During this time Jansons left the band and was replaced by Ethan Mestroni. The first single, "Wasteland", was released in April 2015 with the full EP later the same month. The EP was recorded by Rohan Kumar and mixed by Dave Petrovic. The band toured with As It Is, State Champs and Young Lions during 2015.

In 2016, the band toured with With Confidence before joining Cute Is What We Aim For on their tenth anniversary tour of The Same Old Blood Rush with a New Touch album. It was also announced that the band were to play at Bondi-Blitz. They released a cover of Ariana Grande's "Break Free" on Ghost Killer Entertainment in June. In September 2016, the band announced via a Facebook post, that Ng had chosen to leave the band. The post also included news that they were working on new music with Stevie Knight.

On 21 June 2017, Stand Atlantic announced they had signed to Rude Records, becoming the first Australian band to do so. The band announced later that day that their first single from the new EP, Coffee at Midnight, would be premiered on Triple J's short.fast.loud that night.

Stand Atlantic announced the Sidewinder EP the following week, with a release date set for 15 September 2017. On 23 July 2017, Stand Atlantic released the second single, "Mess I Made", through Hysteria Mag.

On 27 July 2017, they announced they would be supporting New Found Glory on their 20 Years of Pop/Punk tour, playing at sold-out shows across Australia.

The band released one more single before the release of the EP, the title track "Sidewinder" in August. Stand Atlantic were featured in the September issue of Rock Sound magazine.

The EP peaked at number 31 on the iTunes charts during release day. In October 2017, Stand Atlantic announced they would be supporting ROAM on their European and UK tours, starting in November. It was announced in November that Stand Atlantic would be supporting Knuckle Puck on their Australian tour in January 2018. Stand Atlantic's EP, Sidewinder, made 10th place on Rock Sound's Top 50 Albums of 2017.

Stand Atlantic are featured in Kerrang!s hottest bands of 2018.

It was announced late February that Stand Atlantic would be playing Slam Dunk Festival later in 2018.

Debut album Skinny Dipping (2018–2019)
On 4 September 2018, Stand Atlantic announced their single "Lavender Bones" would premiere on Triple J later that night. A debut record was teased and Triple J appeared to post the album's name, Skinny Dipping. Stand Atlantic announced that they had signed to Hopeless Records on 5 September 2018 and that their debut album, Skinny Dipping, would be released in October 2018. On 2 October Stand Atlantic released "Lost My Cool", the second single from their debut album. Stand Atlantic released "Skinny Dipping", the title track and third single on 23 October. It premiered on BBC Radio 1. On 5 July 2019, Stand Atlantic officially announced Miki Rich as a permanent member of the band, after he had been touring with them since 2017.

Pink Elephant (2019–2020)
During Stand Atlantic's UK/EU tour in August 2019, through new merchandise, they announced a single that would be coming out in September titled "Hate Me (Sometimes)". They announced the single would debut on Australian radio station Triple J on 16 September. It was officially released on 17 September, accompanied by a music video. Stand Atlantic announced on 24 October that they had started work on their second album. On 11 February 2020 Stand Atlantic premiered the single "Shh!" on Triple J. They followed this with the single "Drink to Drown" on 2 April 2020, accompanied by a video featuring their fans from over the world. On 13 May 2020 Stand Atlantic unveiled the single "Wavelength".

On 25 June 2020, Stand Atlantic released the single "Jurassic Park", accompanied by a music video. It was also announced that their second full-length album, Pink Elephant, would release on 7 August 2020. Pink Elephant debuted at number 23 on the ARIA Albums Chart.

F.E.A.R. (2021–present)
On April 29, 2021, the band released "Deathwish", a track which featured Nothing,Nowhere, along with an accompanying music video.
On September 17 they released "Superglue" with Birds of Tokyo. On November 4, 2021, they released "Molotov (OK)", with an accompanying music video. Fraser said of the song's themes that "I went to a Christian school for 3 years of my life and when a pastor says 'all gays will burn in hell' during an assembly, you're gonna remember it, and you're gonna write a song about it." 

On January 14, 2022, they released "Pity Party" with Royal & the Serpent as the lead single from their album F.E.A.R. They later released "Hair Out" (stylized in all lowercase) on March 3, 2022, and released their album F.E.A.R. on May 6, 2022.

Musical style and influences
Will Cross of Rock Sound, reviewing Stand Atlantic's EP Sidewinder, wrote: "the trio have created an EP that's assured, accessible and properly brilliant." It's tight, it's soulful, and it's loaded with grit."

The band has stated influences from bands and artists such as Blink-182, The Story So Far, Justin Bieber, Silverchair, The 1975, and Moose Blood.

Members
Current
 Bonnie Fraser – vocals and rhythm guitar (2012–present)
 David Potter – lead guitar (2017–present), bass guitar (2012–2017)
 Jonno Panichi – drums (2015–present)
 Miki Rich – bass guitar (2019–present, touring 2017–2019)

Former
 Arthur Ng – lead guitar (2012–2016)
 Jordan Jansons – drums (2012–2014)

Touring musicians
 Ethan Mestroni – drums (2014–2015)
 Will Robinson – guitar (2016–2017)

Timeline

Discography

Studio albums

Extended plays

Singles

Music videos

Awards and nominations

J Awards
The J Awards are an annual series of Australian music awards that were established by the Australian Broadcasting Corporation's youth-focused radio station Triple J. They commenced in 2005.

! 
|-
| 2022
| f.e.a.r.
| Australian Album of the Year
| 
|

References

External links
 

Australian rock music groups
Australian pop punk groups
Hopeless Records artists
Musical groups established in 2012
2012 establishments in Australia
Musical groups from Sydney
Musical quintets
Female-fronted musical groups